Rusahinili ("city of (King) Rusa I)", modern Toprakkale (Turkey), is an ancient Urartian fortress built by Rusa I, located near the modern city of Van in eastern Turkey.

The site has been excavated by archaeological teams from Germany, the United Kingdom, and other countries.

External links
Toprakkale - Encyclopædia Britannica Article

Archaeological sites in Eastern Anatolia
Van Province
Urartian cities
Castles in Van Province